The National Assembly of the Republic of Artsakh (often shortened:) is the legislative branch of the government of the Republic of Artsakh.

Plans were in place to move the National Assembly from Stepanakert to Shusha on 9 May 2022 to mark the 30th anniversary of the capture of Shusha, but the city came under the control of Azerbaijan in the 2020 Nagorno-Karabakh War.

Electoral system 
The current constitution of Artsakh, amended in 2017, states that all members to National Assembly shall be elected for a five-year term through a proportional electoral system. The National Assembly shall be composed of no less than 27 and no more than 33 MPs. The number of the MPs shall be defined by the Electoral Code.

Prior to the passing of the 2017 constitutional referendum, the National Assembly had 33 members, 22 of whom (17 before 2015) were elected using party-list proportional representation, and the rest elected in single seat constituencies using first-past-the-post voting.

Latest election

Committees 
The National Assembly has 7 standing committees:
 Standing Committee on Defense, Security and Law Enforcement
 Standing Committee on Foreign Relations
 Standing Committee on State and Legal Affairs
 Standing Committee on Social Affairs and Health
 Standing Committee on Production and Manufacturing Infrastructure
 Standing Committee on Budget, Financial and Economic Management
 Standing Committee on Science, Education, Culture, Youth and Sports,

See also

Elections in the Republic of Artsakh
List of legislatures by country
List of political parties in Artsakh
Members of the National Assembly of Artsakh
National Assembly (Armenia)
Politics of Artsakh
President of the National Assembly of Artsakh

References

Government of the Republic of Artsakh
Artsakh
Artsakh
Artsakh